WKLV is an oldies and classic hits formatted broadcast radio station licensed to Blackstone, Virginia, serving Blackstone, Victoria, and Alberta in Virginia.  WKLV is owned and operated by Denbar Communications, Inc.

Translator
In addition to the main station, WKLV is relayed by an FM translator to widen its broadcast area.

References

External links
K92.7 Online

1947 establishments in Virginia
Classic hits radio stations in the United States
Oldies radio stations in the United States
Radio stations established in 1947
KLV